David B. Kennedy (September 2, 1933 – March 10, 2019) was an American politician. He served as a Republican member of the Wyoming House of Representatives.

Life and career 
Kennedy was born in Ann Arbor, Michigan. He attended McGill University, the University of Michigan, Indiana University and Yale University. He served in the United States Army.

In 1967, Kennedy was elected to the Wyoming House of Representatives, representing Sheridan County, Wyoming, serving until 1971. In 1974, he served as Wyoming Attorney General, succeeding Clarence Addison Brimmer Jr. He served until 1975, when he was succeeded by Frank Mendicino.

Kennedy died in March 2019, at the age of 85.

References 

1933 births
2019 deaths
Politicians from Ann Arbor, Michigan
Republican Party members of the Wyoming House of Representatives
20th-century American politicians
Wyoming Attorneys General
McGill University alumni
University of Michigan alumni
Indiana University alumni
Yale University alumni